Daniel Dooley (born 28 June 1990) is an Irish hurler who plays for Cork Senior Championship club Bride Rovers and at inter-county level with the Cork senior hurling team. He usually lines out as a left wing-forward.

Playing career

St. Colman's College

On 28 November 2008, Dooley scored 1-02 from full-forward when St. Colman's College defeated Coláiste Chríost Rí by 4-15 to 2-13 to win the Dr. O'Callaghan Cup.

Cork Institute of Technology

On 1 March 2014, Dooley was at full-forward on the Cork Institute of Technology team that faced the Waterford Institute of Technology in the final of the Fitzgibbon Cup. He was held scoreless throughout the game which resulted in a 0-17 to 0-12 victory for the Waterford team.

Bride Rovers

Dooley joined the Bride Rovers club at a young age and played in all grades at juvenile and underage levels, enjoying divisional and county championship success in the under-12 and minor grades.

On 28 September 2008, Dooley was a substitute when Bride Rovers faced Sarsfields in the final of the Cork Senior Championship. He remained on the bench for the entire game which Bride Rovers lost by 2-14 to 2-13.

Cork

Dooley was added to the Cork senior hurling panel in November 2018. He made his first appearance on 24 February 2019 and scored two points from left wing-forward in Cork's 2-21 to 1-21 National Hurling League defeat of Limerick.

Career statistics

Club

Inter-county

Honours

St. Colman's College
Dr. O'Callaghan Cup (1): 2008

References

External links
Dan Dooley profile at the Bride Rovers GAA website

1990 births
Living people
Bride Rovers hurlers
Cork inter-county hurlers